Mehwish Hayat (born 6 January 1988) is a Pakistani actress who primarily works in Urdu films and formerly in television. She made her debut in film with comedy Jawani Phir Nahi Ani (2015) and later went on to Actor in Law (2016). Hayat is since starred in comedy Punjab Nahi Jaungi (2017), Load Wedding (2018) and London Nahi Jaunga (2022) all of which rank among one of highest-grossing Pakistani films.

2012 romantic drama series Meray Qatil Meray Dildar marked a significant turning point in Hayat's career, earning her praise and nomination for Best Actress at the Lux Style Awards. She later portraying of a strong headed in Kashif Nisar's acclaim series Kami Reh Gayi (2013). She achieved further success by featuring in four of Momina Duraid's romantic dramas—Phir Chand Pe Dastak (2011), Mirat-ul-Uroos (2012), Ishq Mein Teray (2013), Ru Baru (2014) and Anjum Shahzad's highly successful family drama Kabhi Kabhi (2013). Her last Pakistani television appearance was Nadeem Baig's tragic romance Dil Lagi (2016). In 2022 she had a supporting role in the Marvel Cinematic Universe TV series Ms. Marvel, as the character Aisha, who has to flee India to Pakistan during the 1940's. 

Hayat is the recipient of Lux Style Award and was honoured by the Government of Pakistan with the Tamgha-e-Imtiaz in 2019.

Personal life
Hayat was born on 6 January 1988 in Karachi, Sindh, Pakistan. Her mother, Rukhsar Hayat, was a popular television actress during the 1980s, her eldest brother Zeeshan is a singer-composer while her older sister, Afsheen, is a singer as well. Another older brother, Danish Hayat, is an actor and, through him, she's the sister-in-law of Faiza Ashfaq, a model. In 2020 there were reports in the Indian media that Hayat was in a relationship with Dawood Ibrahim, a crime lord on India's most-wanted list. The rumors about the relationship have never been substantiated and were likely slander resulting from Hayat's outspoken opinions.

Filmography

Short films

Television

Web series

Other appearance

Discography
"Pani Barsa"Man Jali (2010)
"Tell Me Why"Meri Behan Maya (2011)
"Har Saans Gawahi Deta Hai"Mirat-ul-Uroos (2012)
"Mujhse Ab Meri Mohabbat Ke Fasanena Kaho"Talkhiyaan (2013)
"Tu Hi Tu" with Shiraz Uppal in 3rd episode of Coke Studio 9 as featured artist (2016)
"Dil Saab Dil Babu"Sitaron Bhari Raat (2019)
"Chamkeeli" with Abrar-ul-Haq (2019)

Awards and nominations 

! Ref
|-
! style="background:#bfd7ff;" colspan="5"|Lux Style Awards
|-
| rowspan="2" | 2013
| Mere Qatil Mere Dildar
| Best TV Actress – Satellite 
|
|
|-
| Mein
| Best TV Actress – Terrestrial
|
|
|-
| 2014
| Kami Reh Gaee
| Best Television Actress – Terrestrial
|
|
|-
| 2016
| Jawani Phir Nahi Ani
| Best Actress (Film)
|
|
|-
| rowspan="2" | 2017
| Dil Lagi
| Best TV Actress 
|
|rowspan="2" |
|-
| Actor in Law
|rowspan="3"|Best Actress (Film)
|
|-
| 2018
| Punjab Nahi Jaungi
|
|
|-
| 2019
|Load Wedding
|
|
|-
! style="background:#bfd7ff;" colspan="5"|Hum Awards
|-
| rowspan="2" | 2013
| rowspan="2" | Mere Qatil Mere Dildar
| Best Actress (Drama)
|
| rowspan="2" |
|- 
| Best Onscreen Couple (Drama)
|
|-
! style="background:#bfd7ff;" colspan="5"|Hum Style Awards
|-
| 2016
| 
| Most Stylish Actress (Film)
|
|
|-
! style="background:#bfd7ff;" colspan="5"|Nigar Awards
|-
| 2017
| Actor in Law
| Best Actress (Film)
|
|
|-
! style="background:#bfd7ff;" colspan="5"|International Pakistan Prestige Awards
|-
| 2017
| Actor in Law
|rowspan="2"|Best Actress (Film)
|
|
|-
|2018
|Punjab Nahi Jaungi
|
|
|}

See also

 List of Pakistani models
 List of Pakistani actresses

References

External links
 
 

1988 births
21st-century Pakistani actresses
Actresses from Karachi
Living people
Pakistani female models
Pakistani film actresses
Pakistani television actresses
Singers from Karachi
21st-century Pakistani women singers
Recipients of Tamgha-e-Imtiaz